Scarlett is a 1994 American six-hour television miniseries loosely based on the 1991 book of the same name written by Alexandra Ripley as a sequel to Margaret Mitchell's 1936 novel Gone with the Wind. The series was filmed at 53 locations in the United States and abroad, and stars Joanne Whalley-Kilmer as Scarlett O'Hara, Timothy Dalton as Rhett Butler, and Sean Bean as Lord Richard Fenton. The miniseries was broadcast in four parts on CBS on November 13, 15, 16, and 17, 1994.

Synopsis
The series begins with Scarlett attending the funeral of Melanie Wilkes, her late sister-in-law and rival for Ashley Wilkes' affection, at which her estranged husband, Rhett Butler, is not present. Heartbroken that he left her, Scarlett sets out for Tara and is saddened when she learns that Mammy, her mainstay since birth, is dying. When she arrives, she sends a telegram to notify Rhett about Mammy under the name of Will Benteen (her sister, Suellen's, husband), because she knows that Rhett won't come if he suspects she is there. Before Mammy passes away, she makes Rhett swear to look after "her lamb", Miss Scarlett. He agrees, although he has no intention of honoring the request. After Mammy dies, Rhett and Scarlett have another hostile encounter, which culminates in him leaving and her returning to the Atlanta house, determined to win him back.

Return to Tara
This section is practically identical to that of the book regarding Scarlett's actions at the funeral and Mammy's death bed.

Going to Charleston
The major differences in Charleston are in the attitude and behavior of the characters, most notably Scarlett and Anne. Scarlett is not shown struggling with her unease in society but rather is criticized when Anne sees her and Ashley go into his hotel room together, resulting in a steamy kiss. Anne is completely different from her counterpart in the novel; while she is supposed to be a clone of Melanie, she coyly flirts with Rhett and does other things that neither her character in the book nor Melanie ever would have done. The series continues to follow the relationship created between them after the book ceases doing so.

Savannah
Scarlett continues to distance herself from the novel as her relationship with her kin is not discovering and assimilating her Irish heritage and family, as much as escaping from her grandfather's household and passing the time. Her decision to go to Ireland is also preceded by cutting off all ties to America as well as the details concerning buying her sister Careen's share of Tara, which had been donated to the convent as a dowry when she became a nun.

Ireland
Once in Ireland, Scarlett is faced with two main conflicts that differ from the novel. She is pursued by Lord Richard Fenton, of whom her kin disapprove. She also faces quandaries and mixed emotions over the physical force the Irish rebels use against British rule, and the way the English treated the Irish is contrasted to how the South was treated by the North.

Katie Colum O'Hara (Cat)
Scarlett keeps her daughter's birth a secret from Rhett to spite him, thinking that if Katie grows up not knowing her father she will not love him. The day that Rhett finally does meet his daughter, he will realize that she does not love him or even know him, thus giving Scarlett her revenge. Katie is barely talked about beyond this - her role in the book as the possible manifestation of a supernatural force is entirely deleted. Anne Hampton-Butler also travels to Ireland with Rhett, which never occurred in the novel, and she even has a lengthy conversation with Scarlett. Her death from yellow fever is also detailed.

Lord Fenton
Lord Fenton's character is much more evil than in the novel. He forces a servant girl named Mary to have sex with him, and he also rapes Scarlett. Mary kills him in retaliation, but Scarlett is accused. The plot completely veers from the novel at this point; when Scarlett is put on trial, Rhett comes to her defense, having learned about Katie. It is also discovered that Colum was killed by Lord Fenton when Colum wanted Fenton to support Mary, who was pregnant with Fenton's child. Mary attempts suicide by drowning herself in the river, but is saved by Rhett. At the trial, Mary is still reluctant to confess that she killed Fenton, but does so after Scarlett is found guilty of murder. Later, Rhett and Scarlett make up with one another and decide to travel the world with Cat.

Cast
 Joanne Whalley-Kilmer as Scarlett O'Hara (4 ep.)
 Timothy Dalton as Rhett Butler (4 ep.)
 Stephen Collins as Ashley Wilkes (2 ep.)
 Sean Bean as Lord Richard Fenton (3 ep.)
 Esther Rolle as Mammy (1 ep.)
 Colm Meaney as Father Colum O'Hara (2 ep.)
 John Gielgud as Pierre Robillard (Scarlett's maternal grandfather) (1 ep.)
 Annabeth Gish as Anne Hampton-Butler (4 ep.)
 Julie Harris as Eleanor Butler (Rhett's mother) (4 ep.)
 Jean Smart as Sally Brewton (3 ep.)
 Melissa Leo as Suellen O'Hara Benteen (2 ep.)
 Ray McKinnon as Will Benteen (husband of Scarlett's sister Suellen) (2 ep.)
 Ann-Margret as Belle Watling (4 ep.)
 Barbara Barrie as Pauline Robillard (one of Scarlett's maternal aunts) (2 ep.)
 Elizabeth Wilson as Eulalie Robillard (one of Scarlett's maternal aunts) (2 ep.)
 Brian Bedford as Sir John Morland (2 ep.)
 Paul Winfield as Big Sam (1 ep.)
 George Grizzard as Henry Hamilton (Melanie's uncle) (3 ep.)
 Helen Burns as Aunt Pittypat Hamilton (Melanie's aunt) (1 ep.)
 Pippa Guard as India Wilkes 1 ep.) 
 Charles Gray as The Judge (1 ep.)
 Bruce Boa as Minister (1 ep.)
 David Kelly as Hall Porter (1 ep.)
 Tina Kellegher as Mary Boyle (3 ep.)
 Owen Roe as Tim O'Hara (3 ep.)
 Apryl O'Shaughnessy as Katie Scarlett Colum O'Hara (1 ep.)
 Rachel Dowling as Bridie O'Hara (3 ep.)

Awards and nominations

References

External links

 
 
 

1994 American television series debuts
1994 American television series endings
American drama films
1990s American television miniseries
1990s English-language films
Films based on American novels
Romantic epic films
Television sequel films
Films directed by John Erman
Films scored by John Morris
Television shows based on American novels
Television series produced at Pinewood Studios
Works based on Gone with the Wind
Television shows set in Charleston, South Carolina